The Parkwood Estate, located in Oshawa, Ontario, was the residence of Samuel McLaughlin (founder of General Motors of Canada) and was home to the McLaughlin family from 1917 until 1972. The residence was designed by Darling and Pearson, a noted Toronto architectural firm, with construction starting in 1916. In 1989, Parkwood was officially designated a National Historic Site, and tours are now given year-round.

House
Parkwood's architectural, landscape and interior designs are based on those of the 1920s and 1930s. The national Historic Sites and Monuments Board describes it as “a rare surviving example of the type of estate developed in Canada during the inter-war years, and is rarer still by its essentially intact condition, furnished and run to illustrate as it was lived within.”

Parkwood was the family home of the McLaughlins from 1917 until 1972. The federal government designated it a National Historic Site in 1989, and it was opened it to the public. R.S. McLaughlin was named a National Historic Person that same year.

Interior
The interiors at Parkwood represent early 20th century design and contain housewares, books, photographs and memorabilia, artwork, and trophies, all displayed in their original settings. Murals include works by Canadian artists Frederick Challener and Frederick Haines. Decorations include carved wood and plaster architectural finishes, as well as novelties such as hidden panels and stairways.

The 55 room mansion has  of space, including the basement and third-floor servants' rooms.

Gardens

The McLaughlin family had an avid interest in horticulture and landscaping, as evidenced by their eleven greenhouses and staff of 24 gardeners. McLaughlin sought out the best talent available to create the numerous gardens of his estate - Harries and Hall in the 1910s, the husband and wife team Howard and Lorrie Dunington-Grubb in the 1920s, and award winning architect John Lyle in the 1930s.

The Parkwood gardens have references to the great gardens of England and Europe, but with a 20th-century spirit. Much of the landscape design draws inspiration from the English Arts & Crafts gardening movement. This style called for a high degree of formality near the house, dissolving into less formal presentation with distance from the house, including a broad expanse of immaculate lawn.

The perimeters included denser woodland borders and the use of cedar hedges to sub-divide the landscape into formal garden spaces, recreation areas, and farming space for the production of cut flowers, fruits, and vegetables. The hedges served to prevent the viewing of the entire landscape all at once and were complemented by garden gates beckoning visitors to proceed through a sequence of garden views and experiences.

Shortly after the family took residence in 1917, landscape designers Harries & Hall were engaged to design a fitting setting for the mansion. This was achieved by linking each principal room of the house to a terrace or garden area just outside and finally out into the beautiful wooded park. The site was further refined during the early 1920s by H.B. and L.A. Dunington-Grubb. The husband and wife design team created spectacular outdoor “garden rooms” including the Italian Garden, Sundial Garden, Summer House and the Sunken Garden. They also refined the South Terrace and designed the intricate lattice fencing for the tennis court and Italian Garden. The Dunington-Grubbs were influential in the development of their profession, were the founding members of the Society of Landscape Architects as well as Sheridan Nurseries. Sheridan Nurseries is still thriving today and remain generous supporters of the Parkwood Foundation.

The last of the major additions to the gardens occurred between 1935–1936, with the commission of architect John Lyle to create the Formal Garden. Lyle was awarded the Bronze Medal from the Royal Architectural Institute of Canada for its design. The two-acre garden is in an art moderne style.

Then and now, the gardens are linked by theme and function to the Parkwood greenhouse complex. Three greenhouses are still used for the production of period and specialty plant materials. The greenhouses display palms, orchids, and tropical plants and are home to the Japanese Garden and the Greenhouse Tea Room. Today, the gardens of Parkwood have been restored to represent how they appeared in the 1930s.

Filming
Parkwood’s beauty and history provide a backdrop for film work and professional photography. The estate appears regularly as the backdrop in fashion photography and magazine ads, and it is one of Ontario’s most popular locations for location filming, arranged by the Ontario Media Development Corporation.

Actors who have filmed at Parkwood

 Adrien Brody, 
 Brendan Fraser, 
 Drew Barrymore, 
 Tom Cruise, 
 Brad Pitt, 
 Kathleen Turner, 
 Adam Sandler, 
 Hugh Laurie, 
 Ben Affleck, 
 Lucy Liu, 
 Tony Shaloub, 
 Alan Alda, 
 Maureen Stapleton, 
 Peter Gallagher, 
 Diane Lane, 
 James Garner, 
 Peter O'Toole, 
 Jeremy Irons, 
 Angela Lansbury, 
 Bob Hoskins, 
 Jane Seymour, 
 Shirley MacLaine, 
 Richard Gere, 
 Hilary Swank, 
 Ewan McGregor, 
 Jackie Chan, 
 Peter Fonda, 
 Julianne Moore, 
 Woody Harrelson, 
 Laura Dern, 
 Kat Dennings, 
 Anton Yelchin 
 Christopher Plummer, 
 Paul Gross, 
 Anne-Marie MacDonald, 
 Colm Feore, 
 Mike Myers, 
 Yannick Bisson, 
 Dave Foley

 Bradley Cooper

Movies and TV series filmed on premises

 12 Monkeys
 54
 Amelia
 America's Castles
 American Gothic (2016 TV series)
 Anne of Green Gables: The Continuing Story
 Bailey's Billion$
 Billy Madison
 Bomb Girls
 The Boys
 The Boys
 Bulletproof Monk
 Canadian Bacon
 Charles and Diana: Unhappily Ever After
 Chicago
 Charlie Bartlett
 Cine Nova, The story of James Bond
 Covert Affairs, episodes in 2012
 Cow Belles
 Doom Patrol
The Expanse
 Feast of All Saints
 Fever Pitch
 The Gathering
 Global Heresy
 G-Spot
 Hollywoodland
 Housecapades with Mike Bullard
 Hemlock Grove
 Hide And Seek
 Impossible Heists
 The Kennedys
 Killjoys
 Life with Judy Garland: Me and My Shadows
 The Last Don
 Marry Me
 Monk
 Mrs. Winterbourne
 Murder in a Small Town
 Murder in the Hamptons
 Murdoch Mysteries
 Nature of the Beast
 A Nero Wolfe Mystery ("Motherhunt")
 Prizewinner of Defiance, Ohio, The
 Queer as Folk
 Ready or Not
 Ref, The
 Relic Hunter
 RFK
 Rich Bride/Poor Bride
 Rita MacNeil's Christmas Special
 Seeing Things (TV series)
 Self Made
 The State Within
 Shadowhunters
 Star Trek: Strange New Worlds
 Tuxedo, The
 Twitches Too
 Transporter: The Series
 Trump Unauthorized
 Undercover Brother
 The Umbrella Academy
 Warehouse 13
 X-Men
 Nightmare Alley

References

External links

 Official website
 Parks Canada page for Parkwood
 Parkwood – Canadian Register of Historic Places
 Heritage Oshawa – Parkwood

Historic house museums in Ontario
Buildings and structures in Oshawa
Houses in Ontario
Darling and Pearson buildings
National Historic Sites in Ontario
Estate gardens in Canada
Museums in the Regional Municipality of Durham
Designated heritage properties in Ontario